Heidi is a computer animated children's television series, based indirectly on the 1881 novel Heidi by Johanna Spyri. The original 2007 television series was a Swiss-French-Italian-Australian co-production in 27 episodes of 26 minutes.

A "remake" (rather than a re-telling) of Heidi, Girl of the Alps, much of the story is the same; the titular character is a then-five-year-old girl, who's taken to her grandfather on the Swiss Alps by her aunt, Dete to live with him and while the girl ends up improving his life, she also befriends Peter, the goatherd of the village Dorfli below and the one who causes her to find a big passion of hers, goats and other animals in general.

But in this version, there is also a trio, Karl, Theresa, and William, who usually try to do something that would downgrade Peter, whom they often refer to as a mountain goat, in some way or another. But in the first winter up there, a letter is eventually gotten and what results from there will end up changing another's life, as well.

The series has been distributed in 138 countries around the world.

Characters
The actors cited are from the English cast.

Heidi Meier (voiced by Monique Hore): The title character, an 8 year old, cute and innocent orphan girl, who's taken to her grandfather, like its base, as well as the base novel. She loves her grandfather and her animal friends so much.
Ernst Meier (voiced by Peter McAllum): Heidi's grandfather, a gentle and turned-grump old man who works as a carpenter. Nicknamed the "Alps Uncle", he owns Little Bear and Little Swan, and later Snowdrop after Little Swan dies in episode 1 of season 2. After a fall in season 2, Ernst starts having trouble doing his work. After an accident with Heidi near the Meier Bridge (formerly the Devil's Bridge), Ernst decides to go to Frankfurt to see Dr. Beckmann, who recommends a surgery which he takes after talking with Frieda.
Peter Bendorf (voiced by Nicole Shostak): 11 year old goatherd. He owns the goat Goldfinch, who becomes a mother to baby Mischief. He reunites with his father, Anton Bendorf, while in Frankfurt in season 2.
Aunt Dete (voiced by Beth Armstrong): Heidi's maternal aunt who forcibly leaves Heidi with her grandfather and shows saccharine self-righteousness with those around her, including her own niece. She works as a partly cooking maid in the Sesemann household, with butler Sebastian who she eventually falls in love with and marries, though where is not actually specified.
Karl Traber (voiced by Charlotte Hamlyn): Used to call Peter "Billy goat" until an incident where he saved Karl's life.
Theresa Keller (voiced by Charlotte Hamlyn): Owns the goat Sweetheart. Theresa is often mean to Heidi and Peter, along with Karl and William but accepts them in episode 33 with Clara and starts being a lot nicer, until season 2.
William Hopfer (voiced by Jamie Croft): A short and obese member of the trio-turned-duo, tends to be distracted by thoughts of food and gets easily filled with fear and has a goat owned by his own family. He's revealed to have found a fox he named Flame.
Clara Sesemann (voiced by Sophia Morrison): 12-year-old daughter of Friedrich Sesemann and Constance Sesemann.  A sweet rich girl who used to be in a wheelchair, but in episode 37 she starts walking for the first time. As of season 2, Clara takes up ballet with Susanne Linke as her teacher.
Joseph: Heidi's grandfather's Saint Bernard.
Chippy: A goldfinch that Heidi takes in after it has been attacked by a predator. He leaves for warmer places, like Africa, during winter, but always comes back in the spring.
Miss Vera Rottenmeier (voiced by Beth Armstrong): The Sesemann household's strict governess, who has an overblown worry of Clara's health, focus on the kids' education and reactions towards animals (though whom she has an allergy of), highly conformist and attentively enforcing of it, the most on "Adelaide" (Heidi), and refuses other's opinions more often than not, in useless stubbornness. Eventually, she comes to view Heidi as a friend as well as Clara's.
Sebastian (voiced by Jamie Croft): The Sesemann household's butler who falls in love with Aunt Dete.
Friedrich Sesemann (voiced by Peter McAllum): Clara's father and Constance's husband. He Married Constance on his wedding just before Clara was born.  In season 2, he is revealed to be in love with an American woman named Elizabeth. He was angry with Clara sometimes in both episode 14 and 15. but When Clara got upset,  he reconciles with Clara with help from Heidi.
Johann Keller (voiced by Peter McAllum, Jamie Croft): Dorfli's grocer, and Theresa's father, Alda's husband.
Alda Keller (voiced by Nicole Shostak): Theresa's snobby mother, and Johann's wife. She's less reasonable than Johann.
Tobias Meier: Heidi's deceased father, who never built the Devil Bridge over a mountain gap he and his father Ernst Meier/ Heidi's Grandfather worked on.
Adelaide Meier: Heidi's dead mother, and Dete's sister.
Anna Meier: Heidi's grandfather's wife. She disappeared in a shipwreck off the coast of Salerno, Italy before Heidi was born. It's later revealed that she woke up in a hospital in Sicily, having no memory of her family in Dorfli, and grew up as the Countess Alice di Burgo, the widow of Count di Burgo from Salerno, Italy, looking after the hospital and an orphanage. After spending time in Dorfli, Anna's memories soon return. She decides to stay with Ernst as Heidi is enrolled in a school in Zurich.
Bridget (voiced by Beth Armstrong): Peter's mother. Together with her mother, Suzanne, she made up the story about Peter's father being a man from Spain named Pablo who died in a war to protect Peter.
Susanne (voiced by Beth Armstrong): Peter's blind grandmother, and Bridget's mother.
Anton Bendorf: Peter's father. A watchmaker from Frankfurt, owner of Bendorf's Watchmakers. Even though he was already married, he fell in love with Bridget. Years later, his wife got sick and died, and he closed his shop for lack of customers.
Constance Sesemann: Clara's late mother and Mr. Sesemann's wife and the late Mrs. Sesemann. She is said to have been a great ballerina. when Clara was a little girl, Her Mother took her to the Park along with her father. Clara took her first steps in the park when she was a baby. her father was proud of her progress. Before she died, she asked her husband to watch over her daughter always so that Clara will have a new mother after her death.
Barbel Hopfer (voiced by Kate Fitzpatrick): A friend of Dete's, and William's mother.
Hans Hopfer : Barbel's husband, the village blacksmith. William's father.
Grandmamma (voiced by Penny Cook): Clara's kind and youthful grandmother. She is an actress in the theatre. She only made an appearance in Season 2, Episode 2. But is  mentioned by Clara in "The Matchmakers".
Hans Bakker: A home-school teacher who excessively punishes Heidi for her confusions and whose own teaching method includes torture involving holding heavy books which gets him fired from teaching at Sesemann Household.
Mr. Traber: Karl's father, who is a school teacher. He and Karl move before Clara's visit. Mr. Traber came back in season 2, but Karl is unspecified.
Ticket inspector: The friendly and helpful train attendant. 
Rudy: A boy in Frankfurt who plays a barrel organ in the street. He's a friend of Clara and Heidi. Owns the kittens, Socks and Star.
Park ranger: Harsh park ranger who keens on flowers and doesn't take care of the animals at the park.
Dr. Beckmann: The Sesemann family doctor, he helps Ernst Meier with an operation in season 2.
Mr. Dinkelmann: In one episode he came to the Sesemann's house to be regarding an adoption for Heidi to be Clara's sister.
Friedrich: Miss Vera Rottenmeier's old friend from Auringen near Frankfurt.
Henry Mason: A man from Liverpool, England who comes to Dorfli. It's eventually revealed that he was after quartz crystals on the White Peak. His actions cause an avalanche that destroys the chalet in the mountains. But is later caught by Grandfather, Heidi and Rico while Mr. Mason tries to escape back to England. Mr. Mason is arrested and Grandfather and Francesco rebuilt the chalet.
Rico Lamfredi: A 7-year-old boy from Puglia, Italy whom Heidi and Ernst take in. He is revealed to be a skilled violinist and can craft wooden sculptures really well.
Francesco Lamfredi: Rico's father. His late wife was named Stella. Originally wanting to go to Marseille in France, he and Rico settle in Dorfli.
Flavio: Francesco's donkey.
Susanne Linke: Clara's ballet instructor. 
Frieda: An orphaned girl Dr. Beckmann once treated. She works for her landlady to hopefully bring her little brother Ulrich to live with her. Because she's never been to school, she never learned to read. Thanks to Heidi though, she managed to learn. On Christmas Eve, Frieda reunites with Ulrich at the Sesemann Household. Ulrich's foster parents agree to adopt Frieda as well and are impatient to meet her.
Ulrich: Frieda's little brother.
Frau Decker: Frieda's cruel landlady.
Alfredo: Countess di Burgo's caretaker. When Grandfather walks in the Frankfurt Park with Heidi after his operation, he finds a woman with Alfredo whom he thinks is his wife Anna. He chases "Anna" but the lady ignores him. Heartbroken, Grandfather faints in the park and Heidi begs for him to wake up.
Caruso: The countess' dog.
Elizabeth: A Texan woman Friedrich Sesemann met in the United States. She becomes Friedrich's fiancé in season 2. she declares that she as soon as she and Friedrich get married, they will get babies. Clara, However, Dislikes Elizabeth. Clara is upset that if she leaves Frankfurt, She will never see her friend Heidi again. But Friedrich comforts Clara by telling her that he loves her. Elizabeth asks a stranger to buy some ballet tickets for Clara and Friedrich Sesemann to have their first Dance at the Ballet Academy. Friedrich asks his daughter to be his escort at the dance.
Fritz Newman: A man from Frankfurt in charge of the clock at the library. He tried to sabotage Anton Bendorf's work on the clock. Fritz calls a policeman and accuses Anton of ruining the clock. But thanks to Frieda's evidence, the policeman arrests Fritz Newman and it is unknown what happens to him after that.
Helmut: A boy living under Frau Decker.

Episode list

Season 1
 Up to the Mountain
 First Day in the Mountains
 The Challenge
 Save Chippy
 The Treehouse Oath
 A Night Out
 For a Loaf of Bread
 Trapped in the Manor
 Beware of the Wolf
 Peter's Treasure
 Attack the Treehouse!
 Save Sweetheart
 The End of Spring
 Clara
 The Bell Tower
 The Promise
 Papa Returns
 Home Schooled
 Let's Make a Show 
 At the Park
 Clara Stands
 Goats in the City
 The Resignation
 A Tree for Shelter
 The Ghost
 The Letter
 Back to Dörfli
 A New Goat in the Herd
 The Broken Statue
 The Brooch
 The School Test
 Scavenger Hunt
 Goat's Hour
 The Storm
 The Devil's Bridge
 Friedrich
 The Wheelchair
 Forgiven
 The Edelweiss

Season 2
Dubbed "Heidi: New Adventures" on Netflix.

 My Best Friend
 Goodbye Little Swan
 Rico
 The Hike
 The Competition
 Bridget's Secret
 The Violin
 Francesco
 The Watch
 The Resolution
 The Choice
 The Operation
 The Lady in Red
 The Matchmakers
 A Marriage is Announced
 Reunited
 A Question of Time
 Under the Christmas Tree
 The Cabin
 The Endangered Mountain
 The Accident
 The Wolpertinger
 Anna
 The Beehives
 A Tough Break
 A Difficult Choice

Production
On the behalf of ZDF, one of the series' co-producers, with the intention of renewing Heidi, Girl of the Alps and fellow series to the modern children's audience, the series was produced from 2013 to 2014, mainly in France, that much like Maya the Bee and Vicky the Viking before, including being done by the same main studio, on the behalf of ZDF, but in this production, multiple other companies, including the Australia-based, specifically-made Heidi Pyl, joined in on making the series.

In the first production, from the writing bible, written by Christel Gonnard, was the first twenty-seven episodes first had their locations shot with high-definition footage, for reference to the animators making the now-fictionalized locations of the series, in Haute-Savoie for the Alps (referred to as that, rather than the Alm, as in the base series and novel) and in Friborg for Frankfurt, similarly to Zuyio (later Nippon)'s team shooting pictures of the official locations themselves, for the setting references to background painters and writers, for the base series. The two halves that happened to be made in that production were directed, respectively, by Pierre-Antoine Hiroz and Anne Deluz. The theme music was two songs at the time; the credits song, replaced by a bit of a piece of background music from the series, when the series was bought the rights out of, was sung by Cindy Santos, first known in 2006, when she participated in the French show Nouvelle Star.

The first three episodes were screen as a "world preview" at Geneva's Tout Ecran Movie Festival (Festival Cinéma Tout Ecran) on October 31, 2007 (albeit only coincidentally for Halloween). Later, was a twenty-episode documentary series, of three minutes each episode, and produced by Rita and Chocolat TV Productions, aired on Télévision Suisse Romande as well as on Chocolat's website, before the latter was removed, which documented the first production. Afterwards, an account of a promoter, impersonating an now-teenage Heidi, was opened on a blog and a MySpace page, where the character promoted the series. The series premiered on the Swiss network Télévision Suisse Romande on December 22, 2007, in Swiss HD. In France, Studio 100 Animation bought the rights in 2013 and produced a 3D series of 39 episodes of 26 minutes each, now directed by Jérôme Mouscadet, from that year to 2014 and the completed series began airing in 2015.

Due to the partnership of Eurovision Fiction, was the series sent to their affiliated countries, including Ireland, Norway (see below), Cyprus (in Greek dub), Slovakia (also see below), Bulgaria and Poland and aired (as of recent, at least part-finished) on the EBU member chains of those countries.

A second season with 26 episodes was soon made.

References

External links
 Heidi on Internet Movie Database

Heidi television series
2015 Swiss television series debuts
2016 Swiss television series endings
2010s animated television series
2010s drama television series
Animated television series about orphans
Italian children's animated adventure television series
Television shows set in Switzerland
Television shows based on children's books
Films produced by Jim Ballantine